Sedeh Rural District may refer to:
 Sedeh Rural District (Fars Province)
 Sedeh Rural District (Markazi Province)
 Sedeh Rural District (South Khorasan Province)

See also
Sedeh District (disambiguation)